Patrick Joseph Guzzo (October 14, 1914 – January 16, 1993) was a Canadian ice hockey player. He was a member of the Ottawa RCAF Flyers who won the gold medal in ice hockey for Canada at the 1948 Winter Olympics in St. Moritz.

References

External links
bio
Team profile

1914 births
1993 deaths
Ice hockey people from Ottawa
Ice hockey players at the 1948 Winter Olympics
Medalists at the 1948 Winter Olympics
Olympic gold medalists for Canada
Olympic ice hockey players of Canada
Olympic medalists in ice hockey